North Kalimantan is a province of Indonesia. It is located on the northernmost of Kalimantan, the Indonesian part of the island of Borneo. North Kalimantan borders the Malaysian states of Sabah to the north and Sarawak to the west, and by the Indonesian province of East Kalimantan to the south. Tanjung Selor serves as the capital of the province, while Tarakan is the largest city and the financial centre.

Formed on 25 October 2012, North Kalimantan was separated from the province of East Kalimantan to reduce development disparity and Malaysia's influence over the territory. North Kalimantan covers 71,827.3 square kilometres and consists of four regencies and one city. It had a population of 524,656 at the 2010 Census and 701,784 at the 2020 Census, making it at that time the least populous province in Indonesia, until the subsequent the creation of the new province of South Papua in 2022 becoming the new least populous Province, with an official population estimates, at mid 2021 of 713,622 people.

History 

In the Míng Shǐ, the official history of the Chinese Ming Dynasty, for the year 1417, Kalimantan was recorded as a kingdom under vassalage to the then Hindu Sulu Kingdom as Kalimantan was ruled by a Sulu monarch named Mahalatu Gelamading ; Maharaja Klainbantangan) where his title,  Klainbantangan, in Chinese rendering, named after his territory, Kalimantan.

North Kalimantan then became territory of the Bulungan kingdom, which was founded by a group of coastal Kayan. Around the 16th century, a Kayan princess called, Asung Luwan, married a visiting nobleman from Brunei, called Datuk Mencang. From this line a princely state was established, centred in Tanjung Selor, which had territory of Bulungan, Tana Tidung, Malinau, Nunukan, Tarakan, and some part of Sabah. Bulungan was a vassal of Berau, which in turn was a vassal of Kingdom of Kutai. During subsequent wars, the territory fell into the hands of Brunei and after agreements were made with the Sultanate of Sulu, the territory officially came under Sulu control. In 1777, the royal family converted to Islam, with the king Wira Amir changing his name to Aji Muhammad, and title to Sultan Amirul Mukminin. In 1853, The Dutch signed a Politiek Contract to impose their sovereignty over the Bulungan kingdom, Sulu was not able to respond as it was also in a war with Spain. Then in 1881, the British North Borneo Company (BNBC) was formed, placing North Borneo (present-day Sabah) under British jurisdiction, and claiming the region of Tawau. While under Dutch control, the sultan was forced to hand over control of the Bahau river, Pujungan river, and Apo Kayan. After long negotiation with the British, the Dutch recognised the British borders in 1915 which became modern the border between Sabah and North Kalimantan. During World War II, the Japanese occupying forces had an agreements with Bulungan in which they shared natural resources and in exchange the region largely escaped the Romusha system.

Bultiken Tragedy 

In 1963, during the Indonesia–Malaysia confrontation, the Sultanate of Bulungan's position on the formation of Malaysia was ambiguous. In April 1964, it was reported that a document was found proving the ties between Bulungan aristocracy and Malaysia and in conflict would support the formation of Malaysia and in turn join Malaysia. On 24 April 1964, leader of regional military commands Mulawarman, Brigadier General Soeharjo ordered the capture and killing of Bulungan aristocracy. On 2 July 1964, Lt B. Simatupang and Captain Buntaran were received cordially by the Sultan of Bulungan. By 3 July 1964, the palace was invaded by units of Brawijaya 517, the palace was burned and looted, and members of the royal family killed. According to Burhan Djabier in his 1991 book, East Kalimantan: The Decline of a Commercial Aristocracy, the central TNI leadership did not act or replace him because, Brigadier General Soeharjo was a known leftist and  politically connected. Most leftists and the PKI were hostile to royals causing parallels the East Sumatra revolution. This is also the position of the sultanate, as according to Dato' Seri Pangeran Sanusi Hussin, the PKI was responsible for the burning of the royal palace and ethnic cleansing.

The surviving royal family fled and became citizens of Malaysia. In 2017, the royal family announced that they were in the process of becoming Indonesian citizens.

Transport 

Tarakan Airport also known as Juwata International Airport on the eponymous island serves the province, as well as an international ferry port with services to Malaysia from Tawau.  There are no international land crossings – entrance into the mainland of the province is by ferry from Tarakan or by road from the south. Large stretches of the roads in this province are of unpaved muddy ditches.

The airport area and runway is also shared with Suharnoko Harbani Air Force Base, a Type A airbase of the TNI-AU (Indonesian Air Force). The airbase is named after the former Minister of Industry of Indonesia, Suharnoko Harbani, who was also formerly an Air Force officer. Formed in 2006, the establishment of this air base is essentially part of the strategy and efforts to realize the defense of the country from the potential and development of threats that will threaten the Indonesia as well as the organization's demands from the Air Force Operations Command II in Makassar to facilitate control of its duties. Before the formation of the Air Base, there was already an Indonesian Air Force post which was under the Balikpapan Air Force Base but due to the development of situation and tension with Malaysia in Ambalat, the leadership of the Air Force decided to form a new airbase. Due to the airport is used both by military and civil aviation, so the apron is also used together. In July 2014, the airport authority initials to build 183 meters taxiway to the military apron which can accommodate 4 Sukhoi and 2 Hercules together and the project is predicted to be finished in December 2014.

The Trans-Kalimantan Highway (Jalan Trans Kalimantan) was finished at early 2019 under the administration of President Joko Widodo. The route connects Pontianak, West Kalimantan with Tanjung Selor, the capital city of North Kalimantan.

Administrative divisions 
North Kalimantan is divided into four regencies (kabupaten) and one city (kota), listed below with their areas and their populations at the 2010 Census and 2020 Census, together with the official estimates as at mid 2021.

Demographics

Ethnicity 
Ethnic groups in North Kalimantan consists of Dayaks and Javanese (predominantly), with a significant population of the Tidung, Bulungan, Suluk, Banjarese, Murut, Lun Bawang / Lun Dayeh, and the other ethnic groups which exist in the province.

Religion
According to the 2020 census, 507,780 people are Muslims, 137,540 are Protestants, 42,260 are Roman Catholics, 4,165 follow Buddhism, 344 are Hindus, 151 are Confusians and 11 follow folk religions.

See also 

 Bulungan Sultanate

References

External links 
  Kaltaraprov.go.id: official North Kalimantan website

 
2012 establishments in Indonesia
Provinces of Indonesia
States and territories established in 2012